is a song that Japanese musician Miyuki Nakajima composed and recorded for the country's acclaimed television documentary program Project X -Chōsenshatachi-, which aired on NHK during the first half of the 2000s.

History
After a couple of commercially lackluster studio albums were released, Nakajima left Pony Canyon, a record label she had belonged to since her debut. Double A-Side single "Earthly Stars (Unsung Heroes)"/"Headlight, Taillight" is the first release under the record label, Yamaha Music Communications, which was newly founded in 2000.

Both songs were originally written for the TV documentary series  which was aired on NHK. Akira Imai, a producer of the television program decided to ask Nakajima to write theme songs, because he was moved by lyrics of her 1998 smash hit "Another Name for Life". Imai thought that her insight on the song coincided with concept of a documentary that reports unknown activities of obscure people, who built up the modern Japanese society. The program premiered in March 2000, and her theme song which features her distinctive vocals widely became known.

An opening and a closing theme on the program were released as the thirty-seventh single for Nakajima in July 2000, and both of them also appeared on her 28th studio album Short Stories released in November 2000. In 2004, Nakajima re-recorded "Earthly Stars" on her studio live album and DVD entitled Miyuki Nakajima Live! -Live at Sony Pictures Studio in L.A.-, released in the following year. Utatabi, her 2008 live album released on CD and DVD also includes a live recording of "Earthly Stars" performed in December 2007.

Reception
"Earthly Stars (Unsung Heroes)" / "Headlight, Taillight" debuted at the number-15 on the Japanese Oricon Chart, in excess of 35,000 copies sold. It became a smash hit because of the long-lasting popularity of the TV documentary program, remaining on the Oricon charts for more than two years.

On 31 December 2002, Nakajima made her appearance on the annual NHK music program Kōhaku Uta Gassen. Here she performed "Earthly Stars" from the tunnel in Kurobe dam, Toyama Prefecture. Nakajima's performance recorded the highest audience ratings from the program in 2002. After appearing on the show, the single began climbing the charts again, reaching #1 in January 2003. The single was later certified to have sold more than a million copies.

Cover versions

Earthly Stars (Unsung Heroes)

Headlight, Taillight

Uses in popular culture
The song Earthly Stars was sung in karaoke form at the end of Episode 7 of the anime Lucky Star. It was sung by a character named Miyuki Takara, voiced by Aya Endo. (see also: List of Lucky Star albums)

The song is also used in the Suntory Boss Commercial featuring Tommy Lee Jones.

The song Headlight/Taillight is used in the anime Nichijou (Part 79)

The song was used in the 15th season of the show GameCenter CX, in the segment Project CX, a segment about Famicom peripherals. Miyuki Nakajima sings the song with lyrics related to the featured peripheral.

Track listing 
All songs written and composed by Miyuki Nakajima, arranged by Ichizo Seo
 – 05:11
 – 04:58
 [TV mix] – 05:11
 [TV mix] – 04:58

Personnel 
 Miyuki Nakajima -  vocals
 Ichizo Seo - keyboards, strings arrangement & conduct
 Hideo Yamaki - tomtom, cymbals
 Hideki Matsubara - bass guitar
 Masayoshi Furukawa - electric guitar
 Elton Nagata - keyboards, acoustic piano
 Keishi Urata - computer programming
 Seiichi Takubo - computer programming
 Masatsugu Shinozaki - violin, concertmaster
 Kiyo Kido - violin 
 Jun Yamamoto - violin
 Yumiko Hirose - violin
 Osamu Inou - violin
 Kei Shinozaki - violin
 Yu Sugino - violin
 Naoyuki Takahashi - violin
 Kathrine Cash - violin
 Tsunehiro Shigyo - violin
 Keiko Nakamura - violin
 Machia Saito - violin
 Masako Mabuchi - viola
 Joshin Toyama - viola
 Gentaro Sakaguchi - viola
 Kaori Naruse - viola
 Masaharu Karita - cello
 Tomoya Kikuchi - cello
 Masahiro Tanaka - cello
 Susumu Miyake - cello
 Yasuhiro Kido - background vocals
 Fumikazu Miyashita - background vocals
 Katsumi Maeda - background vocals
 Toshiro Kirigaya - background vocals
 Etsuro Wakakonai - background vocals

Chart positions

Footnotes: Until expansion of the hit parade in December 2002, Oricon provided only the top-100 sales charts in general (except a more detailed magazine especially published for the music industry called Original Confidence)

References

Miyuki Nakajima songs
Oricon Weekly number-one singles
2000 singles
Songs written by Miyuki Nakajima
2000 songs